Zhwe (Ꚅ ꚅ; italics: Ꚅ ꚅ) is a letter of the Cyrillic script. The shape of the letter originated as a ligature of the Cyrillic letters Ze (З з З з) and Zhe (Ж ж Ж ж).

Zhwe was used in the Abkhaz language where it represented the labialized voiced palato-alveolar sibilant . This was replaced by the digraph Жә.

Computing codes

See also 
Ž ž : Cyrillic letter Zhe
Cyrillic characters in Unicode

Cyrillic letters